Manifest! is the only album from American band Friends, released in June 2012 on the Fat Possum label in the United States and on the Lucky Number label in Europe.

Recording and release
The album was recorded between Summer 2011 and Spring 2012 and produced by the band with the assistance of engineer Daniel Schlett at Strange Weather studios in Brooklyn. The tracks were mixed by the band and Schlett with the exception of "Mind Control" which was mixed by the band and Paul Epworth. The album includes two tracks that were released as singles in 2011, "I'm His Girl" and "Friend Crush", as well as third single "Mind Control".

The album was released on June 4, 2012 outside the United States and on June 5 in the US. A limited special edition exclusive to Rough Trade stores in the UK included a second disc with five extra tracks.

Cover art
The album's cover art was designed by singer Samantha Urbani and Erez Avissar, and features a stereoscopic image of the band.

Reception

Like several other reviewers, Michael Hann of The Guardian commented on the album's "pick'n'mix approach to New York's musical history".

The album was described in a review for the BBC by Nick Levine as "generally impressive".

The album was positively received by the NME, with Lisa Wright rating it 8/10 and describing it as "louche, cool, and wickedly and exuberantly playful". Allmusic reviewer Tim Sendra gave the album a four stars out of five, calling it "a loose-limbed, dancefloor-filling jam with songs that are tropically inspired, sweet-spirited, and fun" and noted the "unusual and memorable" lyrics. The Lists Jonny Ensall described Manifest! as an "insidiously hooky album". Liz Pelly, writing in The Boston Phoenix, called it "the best pop album of the summer". Rolling Stone gave it a 3.5 star rating.

Track listing
All songs written and composed by Samatha Urbani, Oliver Duncan, Lesley Hann, Matthew Molnar, and Nikki Shapiro.

Rough Trade bonus CD
"Perpetual Crush"
"Feelin Dank"
"My Boo"
"I'm His Girl (Arthur Baker remix)"
"Friend Crush (Jake Bullit mix)"

Credits
Friends:
Samantha Urbani
Oliver Duncan
Lesley Hann
Matthew Molnar
Nikki Shapiro
with
Jessica Collins - vocals
Daniel Schlett - vocals, engineering

Chart positions
Manifest! peaked at number 100 in the UK Albums Chart in June 2012.

References

2012 debut albums
Fat Possum Records albums
Friends (American band) albums